Henry Tromp (born 29 December 1966) is a South African former rugby union player.

Playing career
He returned to the Northern Transvaal in 1994 and remained with the union until his retirement.

Tromp made his test debut for the Springboks in 1996 during the second test against  at Kings Park in Durban. He also played four tour matches, scoring one try for the Springboks.

Test history

Conviction
The incident took place in 1992 when Tromp worked at his father's farm. A labourer reported that pounds 11 had been stolen from him and a 16-year-old youth owned up.

Tromp and his father took turns to beat him with a fan belt - the kind of summary justice dished out in apartheid South Africa - but the black kid later died from the injuries.

The Tromps were jailed for aggravated assault. Two-year sentences were halved on appeal and they spent only four months inside.

See also
List of South Africa national rugby union players – Springbok no. 635

References

1966 births
Living people
South African rugby union players
South Africa international rugby union players
Blue Bulls players
Leopards (rugby union) players
Sharks (Currie Cup) players
South African people convicted of murder
South African criminals
Rugby union hookers